Challah (or ; plural:  or ) is a special bread of Ashkenazi Jewish origin, usually braided and typically eaten on ceremonial occasions such as Shabbat and major Jewish holidays (other than Passover). Ritually acceptable challah is made of dough from which a small portion has been set aside as an offering. Challah may also refer to the dough offering. The word is biblical in origin, though originally referred only to the dough offering. Similar braided breads such as kalach and vánočka are found across Central and Eastern Europe.

Name and origins

The term  in Biblical Hebrew meant a kind of loaf or cake. In Hebrew, the word challah is derived from the root  which means “hollow,” “space” or “pierced.” 

In Rabbinic terminology, challah often refers to the portion of dough which must be separated before baking, and set aside as a tithe for the Kohen, since the biblical verse which commands this practice refers to the separated dough as a "challah". The practice of separating this dough sometimes became known as separating challah or taking challah. The food made from the balance of the dough is also called challah. The obligation applies to any loaf of bread, not only to the Shabbat bread. Nevertheless, separating challah may have been more common when baking the Shabbat bread than at other times, because separating challah is only required for large batches of dough (using over 10 cups of flour), such as might be prepared for special occasions.

Variant names

Challah may also be referred to as cholla bread.

The term koylatch is cognate with the names of similar braided breads which are consumed on special occasions by other cultures outside the Jewish tradition in a number of European cuisines. These are the Russian kalach, the Serbian , the Ukrainian kolach the Hungarian , and the Romanian . These names originated from Proto-Slavic kolo meaning "circle", or "wheel", and refer to the circular form of the loaf.

Ingredients and preparation

Most traditional Ashkenazi challah recipes use numerous eggs, fine white flour, water, sugar, yeast, oil (such as vegetable or canola), and salt, but "water challah" made without eggs and having a texture like French baguette also exists, which is typically suitable for those following vegan diets. Modern recipes may replace white flour with whole wheat, oat, or spelt flour or sugar with honey or molasses.

According to Sephardic Jewish observance of halachah, a bread with too much sugar changes the status of the bread to cake. This would change the blessing used over the bread from Hamotzi (bread) to Mezonot (cake, dessert breads, etc.) which would invalidate it for use during the Kiddush for Shabbat. While braided breads are sometimes found in Sephardic cuisine, they are typically not challah but are variants of regional breads like çörek, eaten by Jews and non-Jews alike.

Egg challah sometimes also contains raisins and/or saffron. After the first rising, the dough is rolled into rope-shaped pieces which are braided, though local (hands in Lithuania, fish or hands in Tunisia) and seasonal (round, sometimes with a bird's head in the centre) varieties also exist. Poppy or sesame (Ashkenazi) and anise or sesame (Sephardi) seeds may be added to the dough or sprinkled on top. Both egg and water challah are usually brushed with an egg wash before baking to add a golden sheen.

Challah is usually pareve (containing neither dairy nor meat—important in the laws of Kashrut), unlike brioche and other enriched European breads, which contain butter or milk.

Israeli breads for shabbat are very diverse, reflecting the traditions of Persian, Iraqi, Moroccan, Russian, Polish, Yemeni, and other Jewish communities who live in the State of Israel. They may contain eggs or olive oil in the dough as well as water, sugar, yeast, salt, honey and raisins. It may be topped with sesame or other seeds according to various Minhagim.

Rituals and religious significance

According to Jewish tradition, the three Sabbath meals (Friday night, Saturday lunch, and Saturday late afternoon) and two holiday meals (one at night and lunch the following day) each begin with two complete loaves of bread. This "double loaf" commemorates the manna that fell from the heavens when the Israelites wandered in the desert after the Exodus. The manna did not fall on Sabbath or holidays; instead, a double portion would fall the day before the holiday or sabbath to last for both days.

In some Ashkenazi customs, each loaf is woven with six strands of dough. Together, the loaves have twelve strands, alluding to the twelve loaves of the showbread offering in the Temple.  Other numbers of strands commonly used are three, five and seven. Occasionally twelve are used, referred to as a "Twelve Tribes" challah.

Traditional Sabbath meal procedure

It is customary to begin the evening and day Sabbath and holiday meals with the following sequence of rituals:

 The challah is covered, customarily with a dedicated challah cover cloth. (Normally, in the order of saying blessings, bread would precede wine. Covering the challah allows the Kiddush blessing to come first.)
 Kiddush is recited over a cup of wine.
 Each attendee ritually washes their hands in preparation for eating bread. (It is customary not to talk between this washing and consumption of the bread.)
 The challah cover is removed.
 The two loaves are held up together.
 The head of the household recites the blessing over bread: "" (Translation: "Blessed are you  our God, King of the Universe, who brings forth bread from the earth").
 The bread is sliced (or torn, depending on minhag) and salted, and the pieces are distributed to each person at the meal to eat.

The specific practice varies. Some dip the bread into salt before the blessing on bread. Others say the blessing, cut or tear the challah into pieces, and only then dip the pieces in salt, or sprinkle them with salt, before they are eaten. Some communities may make a nick in the bread with a cutting knife.

Normally, the custom is not to talk between washing hands and eating bread. However, according to some, if salt was not placed on the table, it is permitted to ask for someone to bring salt, before the blessing on bread is recited.

Salting
Salting challah is considered a critical component of the meal. Customs vary whether the challah is dipped in salt, salt is sprinkled on it, or salt is merely present on the table.

The Torah requires that Temple sacrifices to God be offered with salt. Following the destruction of the Second Temple, Rabbinic literature suggested that a table set for a meal symbolically replaces the Temple altar; therefore, the blessing over food should only be recited with salt present on the table. Should one eat a meal without performing a commandment, the covenant of salt protects him.

To the rabbis, a meal without salt was considered no meal. Furthermore, in the Torah, salt symbolizes the eternal covenant between God and Israel. As a preservative, salt never spoils or decays, signifying the immortality of this bond.

Special challah

Rosh Hashanah
On Rosh Hashanah, the Jewish New Year, the challah may be rolled into a circular shape (sometimes referred to as a "turban challah"), symbolizing the cycle of the year, and is sometimes baked with raisins in the dough. Some have the custom of continuing to eat circular challah from Rosh Hashana through the holiday of Sukkot. In the Maghreb (Morocco, Tunisia, Algeria) many Jews will simply bake their challah in the shape of "turban challah" year-round.

Sometimes the top is brushed with honey to symbolize the "sweet new year." According to some traditions, challah eaten on Rosh Hashana is not dipped in or sprinkled with salt but instead is dipped in or sprinkled with honey. As above, some continue to use honey instead of salt through the Sukkot holiday.

challah
Some make an impression of a key on top of the challah before baking, some place a key-shaped piece of dough on top of the challah before baking, and some bake an actual key inside the challah.

The earliest written source for this custom is the sefer  by Rabbi Avraham Yehoshua Heshel, written in the 1800s. He calls  challah "an ancient custom,"  and offers several kabbalistic interpretations. He writes that after spending forty years in the desert, the Israelites continued to eat the manna until they brought the Omer offering on the second day of Passover. From that day on, they no longer ate manna, but food that had grown in the Land of Israel. Since they now had to start worrying about their sustenance rather than having it handed to them each morning, the key on the challah is a form of prayer to God to open up the gates of livelihood.

The custom has been criticized for allegedly having its source in Christian or pagan practices.

Challah rolls
It is often used as the bread for Shabbat or holiday meals.

Similar breads
Similar braided, egg-enriched breads are made in other traditions. The Romanian colac is a similar braided bread traditionally presented for holidays and celebrations such as Christmas caroling .The Polish  is similar, though sweeter than challah. The Czech and Slovak vánočka (vianočka) is very similar and traditionally eaten at Christmas. A sweet bread called milibrod, similarly braided as the challah, is part of the dinner table during Orthodox Easter in Macedonia. In Finnish cuisine, pulla (also known as cardamom bread in English) is a small braided pastry seasoned with cardamom that is very popular in Finnish cafés. Brioche is an egg-enriched bread, but it is not braided.

Unlike challah, which by convention is pareve, many of these breads also contain butter and milk.

See also

Challa (disambiguation page)
Pain petri
Kubaneh
Mouna
Israeli cuisine
Jewish cuisine
Prosphora
Kolach
Korovai

References

External links
 Schlissel Challah – An Analysis BY Rabbi Yair Hoffman

Braided egg breads
 
Jewish baked goods
Jewish breads
Shabbat food
Israeli cuisine
Jewish cuisine
Jewish ceremonial food and drink
Holiday foods